Herman Theobald Glass (October 15, 1880 – January 13, 1961) was an American gymnast who competed in the 1904 Summer Olympics.

In 1904 he won the gold medal in the rings event.

References

External links
 

1880 births
1961 deaths
Gymnasts at the 1904 Summer Olympics
American male artistic gymnasts
Olympic gold medalists for the United States in gymnastics
Medalists at the 1904 Summer Olympics
20th-century American people